Little Havana is a neighborhood of Miami, Florida, United States. Home to many Cuban exiles, as well as many immigrants from Central and South America, Little Havana is named after Havana, the capital and largest city in Cuba.

Little Havana is noted as a center of social, cultural, and political activity in Miami. Its festivals, including the Calle Ocho Festival, Viernes Culturales/Cultural Fridays, the Three Kings Parade and others, have been televised to millions of people every year on different continents. It is also known for its landmarks, including Calle Ocho (SW 8th Street/Tamiami Trail), and its Walk of Fame (for famous artists and Latin personalities, including Celia Cruz, Willy Chirino, and Gloria Estefan), the Cuban Memorial Boulevard, Plaza de la Cubanidad, Domino Park, the Tower Theater, José Martí Park, the Firestone/Walgreens Building, St. John Bosco Catholic Church, Municipio de Santiago de Cuba and others.

Little Havana is the best known Cuban exile neighborhood in the world. It is characterized by its street life, restaurants, music and other cultural activities, small business enterprises, political passion, and great warmth among its residents.

In 2015, Little Havana was included in the National Trust for Historic Preservation’s annual list of 11 Most Endangered Places. In 2017, the Trust declared it a national treasure.

History

Origins
Originally a lower-middle-class Southern and thriving Jewish neighborhood in the 1930s, "Little Havana" emerged in the 1960s as the concentration of Cubans in the area grew sharply. Today, "Little Havana" refers to the neighborhood lying immediately west of Downtown Miami, stretching west from the Miami River for roughly two and a half miles. This sobriquet was applied to the Shenandoah and Riverside neighborhoods in the 1960s, following the beginnings of a vast influx of Cuban refugees there. Little Havana is famous as the cultural and political capital of Cuban Americans, and the neighborhood is a center of the Cuban exile community.

Cuban solidification

In the 1960s, the number of Cubans fleeing the Castro regime led the area to become a hotbed of counter-revolutionary activity. Arriving residents expected their stay in Miami would be temporary, hoping Castro would be deposed. By 1970, the neighborhood was more than 85% Cuban; rather than return to Havana, where Castro remained in power, Cuban Americans began permanently settling in neighborhoods across Miami. Little Havana, however, remained the main landing point for new immigrants and a stronghold for Cuban-owned businesses.

Contemporary population
As of 2011, Little Havana boasts the highest concentration of Hispanics (98%) in Miami. Within the Hispanic population, the Cuban population has experienced a substantial decrease from 84% in 1979 to 58% in 1989; groups of Hispanics from other places, especially Nicaragua, Honduras, and other Central American countries, have substantially increased since the late 1990s. Despite the increasing diversity, most neighborhood businesses are still Cuban-owned.

Borders
 Western Border: Southwest 37th Avenue
 Eastern Border: Southwest 3rd Avenue 
 Northern Border: Northwest 7th Street 
 Southern Border: Southwest 22nd Street (Coral Way)

Demographics 
As of 2000, Little Havana had a population of 49,206 residents, with 19,341 households, and 11,266 families residing in the neighborhood. The median household income was $15,213.16. The ethnic makeup of the neighborhood was 85.08% Hispanic or Latino of any race (mainly Cubans, but also many Nicaraguans and Hondurans, as well as other Latinos), 3.79% Black or African American (not including Afro-Cubans, Afro-Nicaraguans, Afro-Hondurans, and other Afro-Latinos), 10.14% Non-Hispanic White, and 0.96% of other races.

South River Drive Historic District

The South River Drive Historic District is a historic district within the City of Miami's Little Havana neighborhood. In 1987, the Miami City Commission created the locally designated district. Later that year, the National Park Service added the district to the National Register of Historic Places. Located on the eastern end of the neighborhood along the Miami River, the district is just west of Downtown Miami. The district includes 428, 438 Southwest 1st Street, 437 Southwest 2nd Street, 104, 109, 118 Southwest South River Drive. It contains 9 historic buildings.

The South River Drive Historic District derives its significance from both its architectural and cultural history. Developed principally in the first two decades of the twentieth century, the historic district contains the city's oldest extant group of vernacular frame buildings near the Miami River.

Riverview Historic District
Designated on April 7, 2015 by the Historic and Environmental Preservation Board, the Riverview Historic District is a City of Miami historic district located west of Downtown Miami within the Little Havana neighborhood.

The locally designated historic district comprises single and multi-family residences and commercial structures in the Bungalow, Mission, Mediterranean Revival, and Miami Modern styles of architecture.

Viernes Culturales 

Viernes Culturales (English: Cultural Fridays) is an artistic, cultural, and social arts and culture fair that takes place on the last Friday of each month in the historic Little Havana neighborhood of Miami in the heart of Calle Ocho (8th St. SW between 14th and 17th Avenues).

The event consists of outdoor musical performances on a stage and along the sidewalks of Calle Ocho, art exhibits along the sidewalk and in plazas and open spaces, visits to art galleries and cultural centers, cuisine tasting at participating restaurants, and films, art exhibits, and educational programs at the historic Tower Theatre. Free walking tours, led by Miami historian Dr. Paul George leave from the Tower Theater at 7pm during each festival day.

Churches
St. John Bosco Catholic Church
St. Barbara Old Catholic Church (schismatic)
Holy Comforter Episcopal Church
CHRIST'S NATION
Ermita De Regla, Miami
Soldiers of the Cross Evangelical Church
Central Miami Spanish SDA Church
Iglesia Metodista Tamiami
MMM Pequeña Havana
St. Michael the Archangel Catholic Church
Conexion Divina Church
Iglecia Cosecha de Cristo
Shrine-St Philomena Catholic Church
Ministerios Pentecostal Poder
Ministeria Pentecostai Roca De
St. Raymond of Peñafort Catholic Church
Centro Cristiano Casablanca, 2000–2009, an Assemblies of God church that purchased the old Casablanca Banquet Hall and converted the building into a Christian church.  Pastored by Dr. Eddie Rivero until the property was sold to El Rey Jesus Little Havana church which ultimately went into foreclosure.

Parks
Máximo Gómez Park (better known as Domino Park), Calle Ocho
Plaza de la Cubanidad
Cuban Memorial Boulevard Park (SW 13th Avenue)
Sewell Park
Fern Isle Park
Henderson Park
Riverside Park
Jose Marti Park
Shenandoah Park 
Coral gate park 
Bryan Park
Triangle park

Education

Miami-Dade County Public Schools runs area public schools. Schools within Little Havana include:

Public schools

Elementary schools
Citrus Grove Elementary School
Riverside Elementary School
Auburndale Elementary School
Shenandoah Elementary School
Kensington Park Elementary School
Ada Merritt K-8 Center
Mater Academy East Charter Elementary School 
Lincoln-Martí Charter School
St. Michael the Archangel Catholic School (Private School)

Middle schools
Citrus Grove Middle School
Shenandoah Middle School 
Ada Merritt K-8 Center 
SLAM Sports Leadership and Management Charter School
International Studies Charter School
Lincoln-Martí Charter School
St. Michael the Archangel Catholic Church (Private School)

High schools
Miami Senior High School, founded in 1903 (the oldest high school in Miami)
Young Women's Preparatory Academy (all-girls)
SLAM Sports Leadership and Management Charter School
International Studies Charter School
Lincoln-Martí Charter School

Colleges
Miami Dade College- Eduardo Padrón Campus

Libraries
Miami-Dade Public Library operates all area public libraries:
Hispanic Library
Shenandoah Library

Cultural institutions

L'Alliance Française de Miami, French language and cultural society
La Società Dante Alighieri, Italian language and cultural society

Museums and memorials
Bay of Pigs Museum and Library
Bay of Pigs Monument
Cuban Memorial Boulevard Park (SW 13th Avenue)
Freedom Tower

Theaters and performance arts
Tower Theatre, 1508 SW 8th St
Manuel Artime Theatre, 900 SW 1st St
Miami-Dade County Auditorium, 2901 W Flagler St
Teatro 8, 2101 SW 8th St
ArtSpoken Performing Arts Center, 529 SW 12th Ave
Havanafama, 752 SW 10th Ave
Teatro Avante, 744 SW 8th Street 2 Floor

Calle Ocho Festival 

Little Havana hosts its annual Calle Ocho street festival (part of the overall Carnaval Miami celebration), one of the largest in the world, with over one million visitors attending Calle Ocho alone. It is a free street festival with a Caribbean carnival feel sponsored by the Kiwanis Club of Little Havana.

Calle Ocho is where different ethnic communities wear colors or flags representing pride in their heritage. Flags from Colombia to Nicaragua to Puerto Rico to Costa Rica and even Ireland flood the streets. Foods from different countries are usually present for purchase, and popular Latin music like reggaeton, salsa, bachata and merengue can be heard throughout the festival.

In 1977 tensions among Miami's different ethnic groups were running high. Eight Cuban-Americans, mostly from the Kiwanis of Little Havana, were trying to come up with ideas to address the situation. They considered a bicycle race on SW Eighth Street (Calle Ocho). It was turned down because the organizers feared that it would pit one ethnic group against another. Willy Bermello came up with the idea of doing something similar to the block parties and street festivals of Philadelphia. Calle Ocho was born.

The festival takes place between 27th Ave and 4th Ave along Southwest 8th Street. Over 30 stages and hundreds of street vendors participate in the live music street festival now in its 4th decade. Calle Ocho earned an entry in the Guinness Book of World Records when 119,986 people formed the world's longest conga line on March 13, 1988.

In 2010, the Florida legislature identified the Calle Ocho-Open House 8 festival as the official state festival.

Places of interest 

 Calle Ocho (SW 8th Street)
 Cuban Memorial Boulevard (SW 13th Avenue)
 Little Havana Visitors Center (1600 SW 10 Street)
 Centro Cultural Español de Cooperación Iberoamericana,
 Versailles Restaurant SW 8 Street and 36 Avenue
 Padilla Cigar Factory 
 LoanDepot Park (former site of the Orange Bowl)
 Calle Ocho Walk of Fame (SW 8th Street between SW 12th Avenue and SW 17th Avenue)
 Little Havana Food & Cultural Tour,
 Ball & Chain (1513 SW 8 Street) World Famous Live Music Bar & Lounge; originally opened in 1935

See also 

 Havana on the Hudson
 Cuba–United States relations
 Cuban Americans
 Cuban-American lobby
 Mariel boatlift
 Opposition to Fidel Castro
 Ethnic enclave

References

External links

Little Havana at Miami Convention and Visitors Bureau

Neighborhoods in Miami
Ethnic enclaves in the United States
Cuban-American history
Cuban-American culture in Miami
Cuba–United States relations
Tourist attractions in Miami
Historic Jewish communities
Historic districts on the National Register of Historic Places in Florida
National Register of Historic Places in Miami